Adonis Diaz (born May 9, 1996) is an American judoka. He won one of the bronze medals in the men's 60 kg event at the 2019 Pan American Games held in Lima, Peru.

Career 

In 2013, he won the silver medal in the men's 55 kg event at the Pan American Judo Championships held in San José, Costa Rica.

He won one of the bronze medals in the mixed team event at the 2014 Summer Youth Olympics held in Nanjing, China. He also competed in the boys' 66 kg event.

He competed in the men's 60 kg event at the 2018 World Judo Championships held in Baku, Azerbaijan. In 2019, he competed in the men's 60 kg event at the 2019 World Judo Championships held in Tokyo, Japan.

In 2020, he won the silver medal in the men's 60 kg event at the Pan American Judo Championships held in Guadalajara, Mexico.

Achievements

References

External links
 
 Adonis Diaz at the 2019 Pan American Games

1996 births
Living people
Place of birth missing (living people)
American male judoka
Judoka at the 2014 Summer Youth Olympics
Pan American Games medalists in judo
Pan American Games bronze medalists for the United States
Judoka at the 2019 Pan American Games
Medalists at the 2019 Pan American Games
21st-century American people